Serge Ducosté (born 4 February 1944) is a Haitian football defender who played for Haiti in the 1974 FIFA World Cup. He also played for Aigle Noir AC

References

External links
FIFA profile

1944 births
Haitian footballers
Haiti international footballers
Aigle Noir AC players
Ligue Haïtienne players
Association football defenders
1974 FIFA World Cup players
CONCACAF Championship-winning players
Living people